John Allison may refer to:

 John Allison (Canadian politician) (1753–1821), Irish-born farmer, merchant and politician in Nova Scotia
 John Allison (Representative) (1812–1878), U.S. Representative for Pennsylvania's 20th and 23rd Districts
 John Fall Allison (1825–1897), pioneer settler, justice of the peace and Gold Commissioner in the Similkameen Country of the Southern Interior of British Columbia, Canada
 John Allison (footballer) (1884–?), British footballer
 John W. Allison (1893–?), (John Williams Allison) artist, collector and singer of folk songs
 John Moore Allison (1905–1978), U.S. ambassador to Japan, Indonesia, and Czechoslovakia
 Sir John Allison (RAF officer) (born 1943), Air Chief Marshal, RAF
 John A. Allison IV (born 1948), chairman and former CEO of BB&T
 John Allison (anthroposophist) (born 1950), New Zealand/Australian poet, musician, and anthroposophist
 John Allison (special effects designer), American special effects designer
 John Allison (comics) (born 1976), author of the webcomics Scary Go Round and Giant Days

See also
 John R. Alison (1912–2011), World War II ace